Kallambalam is a suburb of Varkala Town situated in Thiruvananthapuram district. Kallambalam joins Varkala with National Highway 66. It is 36 km north from state capital Trivandrum, 30 km south of Kollam, 8 km East of Varkala and 12 km West of Kilimanoor.

Geography
In recent old days there were a stone rest place like a bus stop. From this the name Kallambalam came into existence ("kall" means stone in Malayalam). Kallambalam is situated at National Highway 66. It is the northernmost town of Thiruvananthapuram District. Kallambalam town came under the administrative control of three grama panchayaths. They are Ottor Grama Panchayth, Karavaram Grama Panchayath and Navaikulam Grama Panchayth.

Location
Kallambalam is on the National Highway 66. It is near Varkala (10 km) and Attingal (11 km). The nearest airport is Thiruvananthapuram International Airport. Nearest Railway station is Varkala Sivagiri Railway Station. It is around 41 km north of Thiruvananthapuram City and 29 km south of Kollam City,
Kallambalam is the main commercial center between Attingal and Paripally, Kallambalam shared the border of three Grama panchayaths, Karavaram, Navaikulam and Ottoor. Nearest KSRTC Bus stand Attingal.Changattu Sree Bhagavathy Temple, Kaduvayil Juma Masjid, Navaikulam Valiyapalli, Sri Sankaranarayana Temple Navailkulam, Sree Ulakudayaperumal Thampuran Temple Mullaramcode etc are the main temples and mosques in and around Kallambalam

References

External links

 About Kallambalam

kallambalam got ite name from a small temple which is made up of stones. Now the temple has vanished off during the development of kallambalam.
Navaikulam Sree Shankaranarayanaswamy Temple is a very famous traditional temple nearby Kallambalam, and the distance is around 1.5 km only.kallambalam near school in GVHSS njekkad.

Villages in Thiruvananthapuram district